Our Lady Queen of Peace Church, Richmond is a Roman Catholic church in Sheen Road, Richmond, London. It serves the East Sheen parish in the Roman Catholic Archdiocese of Southwark and, as it is close to Richmond's boundary with East Sheen, is often known as Our Lady Queen of Peace Church, East Sheen.

It was the first church to be designed by architect F G (Frank) Broadbent (1909–1983) (of Goodhart-Rendel, Broadbent and Curtis). 	 	

The foundation stone was laid in November 1953 by the Rt Reverend Monsignor Cyril Cowderoy, Roman Catholic Bishop of Southwark. The church opened on 9 May 1954 and was expanded in 1963. The consecration, by Archbishop Cyril Cowderoy, did not take place until June 1971. A new parish hall was  built in 1992.

The church became a parish in its own right in 1959. Its priest is Monsignor William Saunders.

References

External links
 Official website

Churches in the Diocese of Southwark
East Sheen
Richmond, London
Roman Catholic churches in the London Borough of Richmond upon Thames